Bartlett Mullins (13 August 1904 – 15 May 1992) was a British actor.

Career
He is best remembered by British TV viewers as Mr Clough "Cloughie", Bob and Terry's workmate in the sitcom The Likely Lads. He also appeared on episodes of Z-Cars, Danger Man, Maigret, The Saint, Dixon of Dock Green, Doctor Who (in the serial The Sensorites), Adam Adamant Lives!, The Prisoner, On the Buses, Steptoe and Son, Secret Army and Worzel Gummidge.

His stage work included  Dorothy L. Sayers The Zeal of Thy House at London's Garrick Theatre in 1938; and Sacha Guitry's Don't Listen, Ladies at the Booth Theatre on Broadway in 1948–49.

Selected filmography

 Dancing with Crime (1947) - Club Barman (uncredited)
 Daughter of Darkness (1948) - Irish Shopkeeper (uncredited)
 The Three Weird Sisters (1948) - Dispenser
 No Room at the Inn (1948) - Councillor Medlicott (uncredited)
 The Case of Charles Peace (1949) - Mr. Brion
 Gone to Earth (1950) - Chapel elder, dress shop owner
 Ha'penny Breeze (1950) - Windy (uncredited)
 Stolen Face (1952) - 3rd Farmer (uncredited)
 The Wild Heart (1952) - Chapel elder
 Wheel of Fate (1953)
 Eight O'Clock Walk (1954) - Hargreaves
 Conflict of Wings (1954) - Soapy
 The Green Carnation (1954) - Gallery official
 To Dorothy a Son (1954) - Mechanic (uncredited)
 The Red Dress (1954) - Swann (segment "Panic' story)
 Track the Man Down (1955) - Chief clerk (uncredited)
 The Quatermass Xperiment (1955) - Zookeeper (uncredited)
 A Time to Kill (1955) - Coroner (uncredited)
 The Curse of Frankenstein (1957) - Tramp (uncredited)
 Robbery Under Arms (1958) - Paddy, town drunk
 Innocent Sinners (1958) - Dwight (uncredited)
 The Adventures of Hal 5 (1958) - Ben
 Sapphire (1959) - Newsagent (uncredited)
 Peeping Tom (1960) - Mr. Peters - News Agent Shop Owner (uncredited)
 Saturday Night and Sunday Morning (1960) - Waiter (uncredited)
  Edgar Wallace Mysteries (Episode: 'Solo for Sparrow') -  (1962) - Mr. Walters
 Rasputin the Mad Monk (1966) - Waggoner (uncredited)
 The Sandwich Man (1966) - George Pocket
 Frankenstein Created Woman (1967) - Bystander
 Half a Sixpence (1967) - Carshott
 The Mini-Affair (1967) - Joke Shop Salesman
 A Nice Girl Like Me (1969) - Male Basket Weaver
 Trog (1970) - Butcher (uncredited)
 Sex and the Other Woman (1972) - Henry
 Tales from the Crypt (1972) - First Blind Man (segment 5 "Blind Alleys") (uncredited)
 The Changes (1975) - Old Man with Cats

References

External links

1904 births
1992 deaths
People from Crosby, Merseyside
English male stage actors
English male film actors
English male television actors
English people of Irish descent
20th-century English male actors